Sir Caesar Colclough, 2nd baronet (1623–1684), of Greenham, Thatcham, Berkshire and Tintern Abbey, County Wexford, was an English Member of Parliament.

He was a Member (MP) of the Parliament of England for Newcastle-under-Lyme in 1661.

References

1623 births
1684 deaths
17th-century English people
People from Greenham
Members of the Parliament of England (pre-1707)
Baronets in the Baronetage of Ireland